Lamiomimus gottschei is a species of beetle in the family Cerambycidae. It was described by Kolbe in 1886. It is known from Russia, North Korea, and China.

References

Lamiini
Beetles described in 1886